A Kid Like Jake is a 2018 American drama film directed by Silas Howard and written by Daniel Pearle, based on his own 2013 play of the same name. The film stars Claire Danes, Jim Parsons, Priyanka Chopra, Amy Landecker, Ann Dowd, and Octavia Spencer.

It had its world premiere at the Sundance Film Festival on January 23, 2018. Distributed by IFC Films, A Kid Like Jake had a limited release  on June 1, 2018. The film received mixed reviews from critics, with praise for the performances of its cast.

Plot
Alex and Greg Wheeler are parents to their four-year-old son Jake. The struggles of getting into a prestigious kindergarten are apparent for the couple as the Wheelers are not the richest family living in New York. Family friend and preschool principal, Judy, suggests they take advantage of Jake's recently developing interests in gender non-conformity in order to gain admission.

Cast
 Claire Danes as Alex Wheeler,  a nervous newly pregnant mother, Greg's wife and Jake's mom.
 Jim Parsons as Greg Wheeler, a licensed master social worker, Jake's father and Alex's husband
 Priyanka Chopra as Amal, Alex and Greg's single mother friend
 Leo James Davis as Jake Wheeler, Alex and Greg's preschool age son
 Amy Landecker as Sandra, Greg's client who is facing marital issues
 Ann Dowd as Catherine, Alex's mom 
 Octavia Spencer as Judith "Judy" Lawson, Jake's preschool principal
 Aasif Mandvi as Darren, Amal's boyfriend 
 Rhys Bhatia as Sanjay, Amal's child
 Annika Boras as Lynn

Production 
On February 24, 2017, it was announced that Claire Danes and Jim Parsons had been cast in the drama film adaptation of A Kid Like Jake, a play by Daniel Pearle who would also adapt; while Silas Howard would direct. Parsons and Todd Spiewak would be producing the film through their banner That's Wonderful Productions along with Eric Norsoph, Paul Bernon for Burn Later, and Rachel Song for XS Media.

On May 12, 2017, Octavia Spencer was cast in the film, while Priyanka Chopra, Ann Dowd, and Michaela Watkins were in negotiations to be cast. In July 2017, Amy Landecker joined the cast.

Release
The film had its world premiere at the Sundance Film Festival on January 23, 2018. Shortly after, IFC Films acquired U.S. distribution rights to the film. It received a limited release on June 1, 2018. Playing in 13 theaters, the film grossed $44,824.

Reception
The site's critical consensus reads, "A Kid Like Jake poses some truly interesting possibilities -- many of which are lost in its overly cautious approach to an admittedly sensitive subject." Metacritic, which uses a weighted average, assigned the film a score of 60 out of 100, based on 19 critics, indicating "mixed or average reviews".

The Hollywood Reporter called the film a "lovely comedy-drama". The Associated Press gave the film three out of four, writing "Both Danes and Parsons excel in these well-written roles, with a compelling supporting cast around them that includes Octavia Spencer, Priyanka Chopra, Ann Dowd and Amy Landecker. A Kid Like Jake might not be especially cinematic, but it is profound in its simplicity and truthfulness about what real fights sound like and what real lives look like."

References

External links 
 

2018 films
American drama films
Films shot in New York City
American films based on plays
Transgender-related films
American LGBT-related films
2018 LGBT-related films
LGBT-related drama films
IFC Films films
2018 independent films
2018 drama films
Films scored by Roger Neill
Films about parenting
2010s English-language films
2010s American films